The Black Cavalier (French: Le cavalier noir) is a 1945 French historical adventure film directed by Gilles Grangier and starring Georges Guétary, Mila Parély and Jean Tissier. It also marked the screen debut of Nicole Maurey who appeared in a supporting role.

The film's sets were designed by the art director Roland Quignon. Location shooting took place at the Château de Vaudémont in Eastern France. It was one of the most popular movies in France in 1945 with admissions of 3,672,572.

Synopsis
In French Flanders in the early eighteenth century, a nobleman who has been dispossessed of his property becomes a notorious outlaw. He targets the salt tax collector Monsieur de Saint-Brissac, but is lured by his attractive daughter into a trap.

Cast
 Georges Guétary as le seigneur Ramon de Ortila
 Mila Parély as Lola
 Jean Tissier as Le Hardi
 André Alerme as Monsieur de Saint-Brissac
 Nicole Maurey as Solange de Saint-Brissac
 Simone Valère as Lison
 Michèle Philippe as Marion
 Georgette Tissier as Annette
 Aimé Simon-Girard as Simon
 Thomy Bourdelle as Pierre le Mauvais
 Paul Demange as Plume
 Albert Rémy as Pinte
 René Fluet as 	Pot
 Paul Faivre as Le meunier

References

Bibliography
 Powrie, Phil & Cadalanu, Marie . The French Film Musical. Bloomsbury Publishing, 2020.

External links
The Black Cavalier at IMDb

1945 films
1940s historical adventure films
French historical adventure films
1940s French-language films
Films directed by Gilles Grangier
Films set in the 18th century
Films set in Flanders
French black-and-white films
1940s French films